The Prince's Child (German: Das Fürstenkind) is a 1927 German silent drama film directed by Jacob Fleck and Luise Fleck and starring Harry Liedtke, Vivian Gibson and Evi Eva. It is based on Franz Lehár's 1909 operetta of the same name.

The film's sets were designed by the art director Jacek Rotmil.

Cast
 Harry Liedtke as Hadschi Stavros, Fürst von Parnes 
 Vivian Gibson as Mary Ann Barley 
 Evi Eva as Dolly Barley 
 Fred Louis Lerch as Bill Harrys 
 Adolphe Engers as Dr. Hyppolyte Clerinay 
 Iwa Wanja as Photini, Prinzessin von Parnes 
 Teddy Bill as Trottulos

References

Bibliography
 Bock, Hans-Michael & Bergfelder, Tim. The Concise CineGraph. Encyclopedia of German Cinema. Berghahn Books, 2009.

External links

1927 films
Films of the Weimar Republic
German silent feature films
Films directed by Jacob Fleck
Films directed by Luise Fleck
1927 drama films
German drama films
German black-and-white films
Films based on operettas
Films based on French novels
Silent drama films
1920s German films
1920s German-language films